Emily Riley or Reilly may refer to:

 Emily Riley, Canadian curler
 Emily Riley (actress) in Left for Dead (2007 horror film)
 Emily Riley, footballer for Crewe Alexandra L.F.C.
 Emily Reilly, character in The Killing Room